The Independence Day of Bangladesh ( Shadhinôta Dibôsh) is celebrated on 26 March as a national holiday in Bangladesh. It commemorates the country's declaration of independence from Pakistan in the early hours of 25 March 1971.

History 

In the 1970 Pakistani general election, under the military government of President Yahya Khan, the largest political party Awami League, led by Bangabandhu Sheikh Mujibur Rahman, won a clear majority in East Pakistan national seats as well as provincial assembly. Zulfikar Ali Bhutto conspired with Yahya Khan and changed their position, refusing to hand over power to Sheikh Mujib. Negotiations began between the two sides, however the ruling West Pakistani leadership did not trust Sheikh Mujib, due to instances such as the Agartala conspiracy case. When it became evident that the promises made by the West Pakistan government were not going to be kept, many East Pakistani Bangla-speaking Muslims and Hindus began a spirited struggle for independence. On 7 March 1971 Sheikh Mujib gave his famous speech at the Ramna Racecourse, in which he called for a non-cooperation movement.

Authorities, mostly West Pakistani personnel, rounded up Bengali armed forces officers, NCOs, and enlisted personnel. Forced disappearances went rampant. On the evening of 25 March, in an interview with David Frost, Sheikh Mujib still called out openly for negotiation and a united Pakistan. That night the Pakistan Army began Operation Searchlight, conclusively signalling West Pakistan was not ready for a transfer of political power to the Awami League led by Sheikh Mujibur Rahman.

The Independence of Bangladesh was declared on 26 March 1971 at the first watch by Sheikh Mujibur Rahman . Another declaration was read out on 27 March 1971, by Major Ziaur Rahman, on behalf of Sheikh Mujibur Rahman.  Major Zia (who was also a BDF Sector Commander of Sector 1 and later of Sector 11) raised an independent Z Force brigade, Chittagong and the guerilla struggle officially began. The people of Bangladesh then took part in a nine-month guerilla war against the Pakistan Army and their collaborators, including paramilitary Razakars. This resulted in the death of about 3 million Bangladeshi, as per Awami league and Indian sources, in the Bangladesh War of Independence and Bangladesh Genocide. The BDF, later with military support from India, defeated the Pakistan Army on 16 December 1971, leading to the end of the war and the Surrender of Pakistan.

Celebrations

Independence Day is commonly associated with parades, political speeches, fairs, concerts, ceremonies, and various other public and private events celebrating the history and traditions of Bangladesh. TV and radio stations broadcast special programs and patriotic songs in honor of Independence Day. A thirty-one gun salute may be conducted in the morning. The main streets are decorated with national flags. Different political parties and socioeconomic organizations undertake programs to mark the day in a befitting manner, including paying respects at National Martyrs' Memorial at Savar near Dhaka.

Google displayed a doodle commemorating the Independence Day of Bangladesh on 26 March 2017 on their bd domain. The same year celebrations were organised in Tripura, India, by Bangladesh deputy high commissioner stationed there.

2021 marks the Golden Jubilee of the Independence of Bangladesh from Pakistan.

Independence Award 
The Independence Day Award, which is bestowed upon Bangladeshi citizens or organizations on the eve of the Independence Day, is awarded by the government of Bangladesh. This annual award, instituted in 1977, is given for substantial contribution in the Independence War, the Language Movement, education, literature, journalism, public service, science-technology, medical science, social science, music, games and sports, fine arts, rural development, and other fields.

In 2016, a total of 15 renowned personalities were honored with the independence award, in recognition of their outstanding contributions to their respective fields. Prime Minister Sheikh Hasina handed over the awards at a program held at the capital's Osmani Memorial Auditorium. The awardees are- the then Finance Minister Abul Maal Abdul Muhith, former Jute and Textiles Minister M Imazuddin Pramanik, late Moulvi Asmat Ali Khan, Squadron Leader (retd) Badrul Alam, former police super Shaheed Shah Abdul Mazid, M Abdul Ali, AKM Abdur Rouf, KM Shihab Uddin, Syed Hasan Imam, late Rafiqul Islam, Abdus Salam, late Prof Dr Maksudul Alam, Dr Mohammad Rafi Khan, Poet Nirmalendu Goon, Rezwana Chowdhury Banya.

Ten renowned personalities and an organization were awarded the Independence Award-2020. They were: Golam Dastagir Gazi MP, Commander Abdur Rouf (posthumous), Md Anwar Pasha (posthumous), Azizur Rahman, Prof Dr Md Obaidul Kabir Chowdhury, Prof Dr AKMA Muqtadir, SM Raij Uddin Ahmed, Kalipada Das, Ferdousi Mazumder, and Bharateswari Homes.

On the other hand, the government awarded nine individuals and one institution for Independence Award-2021. AKM Bazlur Rahman, Shaheed Ahsanullah Master, Brig Gen (retd) Khurshid Uddin Ahmed, and Akhtaruzzaman Chowdhury Babu were the recipients then, while other awardees include Dr Mrinmoy Guha Neogi, Mohadev Saha, Ataur Rahman, Gazi Mazharul Anwar, and Dr M Amjad Hossain.

See also 
 History of East Pakistan (1947–1971)
 The Blood telegram
 East Bengal
 Bengali Genocide Remembrance Day

References

Public holidays in Bangladesh
Bangladesh
March observances